The World Arabian Horse Organization (WAHO) is the world organization for the preservation, improvement and preservation of Arabian horses.  WAHO grants membership to nations after examination of national breeding stud books, and review of regulations for each country.

Candidates for membership

External links
 Official site

Horse breed registries
Equestrian organizations
Arabian and part-Arabian horses